Geboltskirchen is a municipality in the district of Grieskirchen in the Austrian state of Upper Austria.

Population

References

Cities and towns in Grieskirchen District